Wickenburg High School is a high school in Wickenburg, Arizona under the jurisdiction of the Wickenburg Unified School District. It is double-listed on the National Register of Historic Places in Arizona. The original Colonial Revival high school and annex were completed in 1925 and 1935, respectively. In 1934, the Works Progress Administration-built gymnasium was completed in a Moderne style. It is the town's only WPA building and the larger of two cast-in-place concrete structures in the town; it also is separately listed. The two buildings were put on the NRHP at the same time (July 1986). In 1999, the high school moved to a new building.

Service area
Within Maricopa County, the school district, and therefore Wickenburg High's attendance boundary, includes that county's portion of Wickenburg and sections of Buckeye and Surprise. Within Yavapai County it includes that county's portion of Wickenburg and that county's section of Peoria.

Congress Elementary School District sends high school students to Wickenburg High. Previously students from the Yarnell Elementary School District (model Creek School) could select Wickenburg High as an option for high school, but in order to reduce taxes, the Yarnell Elementary district board removed the Wickenburg option in November 2018.

History
During the evacuation period of the Yarnell Hill Fire, the school was used as an evacuation shelter for the nearby town of Yarnell.

References

Public high schools in Arizona
Schools in Maricopa County, Arizona
National Register of Historic Places in Maricopa County, Arizona
Educational institutions established in 1925
School buildings on the National Register of Historic Places in Arizona
Colonial Revival architecture in Arizona
Moderne architecture in Arizona
1925 establishments in Arizona